Sacrifice (For Love) is the second solo release of Wipers frontman Greg Sage. It was recorded and released in 1991.  It contains a cover of the Yardbirds' "For Your Love."

Track listing
All tracks composed by Greg Sage unless otherwise noted.

"Stay by Me"
"Sacrifice (For Love)"
"Know by Now"
"Forever"
"The Same Game"
"No Turning Back"
"Ready or Not"
"For Your Love" (Graham Gouldman)
"This Planet Earth"
"Dreams"

References

1991 albums
Restless Records albums